Dead Mans Pass is a gap located in Val Verde County, Texas an elevation of 1837 feet.

Originally a pass along the Chihuahua Road or Old Spanish Road, later San Antonio-El Paso Road, between the first and second crossings of the Devils River. 
This place along the road north Comstock called “Dead Man's Pass” or “Dead Man's Run” saw many travelers die in the 19th century near the south entrance, it was described as a narrow canyon near Pecan Springs.

Texas State Highway 163 now passes through it from north to south between Comstock and Bakers Crossing.

References

External links
 Dead Mans Pass, USGS 1:24K topographic map Dead Mans Pass, TX. from topoquest.com accessed January 10, 2014.
  Doug Braudaway, Dead Man’s Pass, Val Verde County Historical Commission, from vvchc.net, accessed Feb. 14, 2014.

Mountain passes of Texas
Landforms of Val Verde County, Texas
San Antonio–El Paso Road